Bubendorf may refer to:

in Switzerland
Bubendorf, a municipality in the canton of Basel-Country
a former German name for Boncourt, Switzerland, in the canton of Jura
in Germany
the place Bubendorf (Saxony) in the municipality of Frohburg, district Leipziger Land, Saxony
in Austria
Bubendorf (Wolfsbach), in the municipality Wolfsbach, Lower Austria
Bubendorf (Pilgersdorf), in the municipality Pilgersdorf, Burgenland